Apex, titled Apex Predator in the UK, is a 2021 American science fiction action film directed by Edward John Drake and written by John Drake and Corey William Large. It stars Neal McDonough and Bruce Willis and was released on November 12, 2021.

Plot
In the not-too-distant future, Thomas Malone, an ex-cop, is a prisoner serving a life sentence for a crime he didn't commit. He's offered a chance at freedom if he wins a secret game on a private island as "prey" to five ultra-rich "hunters." One by one, the hunters turn on each other due to egos and grudges. The final hunter alive, Samuel, the "Apex Warrior," gets outwitted in the end. Malone wins his freedom so he can see his family again.

Cast
 Bruce Willis as Thomas Malone
 Neal McDonough as Samuel Rainsford
 Corey William Large as Carrion
 Lochlyn Munro as Lyle
 Trevor Gretzky as Ecka
 Nels Lennarson as Bishop
 Megan Peta Hill as Jeza
 Adam Huel Potter as Warden Nicholls
 Joe Munroe as Damien
 Alexia Fast as West Zaroff

Production
The film was shot in Victoria, British Columbia. Filming wrapped in November 2020.

Release
Apex was released by RLJE Films on November 12, 2021. The film was released in some regions as Apex Predator.

Box office
As of November 11, 2022, Apex grossed $11,984 in the United Arab Emirates.

Critical reception
On the review aggregator website Rotten Tomatoes, the film holds an approval rating of  based on  reviews.

Leslie Felperin of The Guardian gave it 1 out of 5 and called it  "a tedious genre exercise".
Sara Michelle Fetters of MovieFreak.com gave it 1 out of 4 and wrote: "Its bad. Lets just leave it at that and call it a day."

A positive review came from Alan Ng of Film Threat who gave it 7 out of 10, saying it "has the right level of seriousness that keeps it from becoming camp and crazy enough to keep it from becoming too serious for its own good."

Accolades
Bruce Willis was nominated for his performance in this movie, as he was for all movies he appeared in, in 2021, in the category Worst Performance by Bruce Willis in a 2021 Movie at the Golden Raspberry Awards. The category was later rescinded after he announced his retirement due to aphasia.

References

External links
 
 

2021 films
2021 independent films
2021 science fiction action films
American science fiction action films
Films about death games
Films directed by Edward John Drake
Films shot in British Columbia
2020s English-language films
2020s American films